John Henry Low (July 7, 1857July 4, 1934) was a 19th-century American Boston maritime pilot. He was the dean of the Boston Harbor pilots and nationally known, having served for almost fifty years. Low was owner of the pilot boats Liberty, Hesper, and Eben D. Jordan. He died on July 4, 1934, in Chelsea, Massachusetts.

Early life 

John. H. Low was born in Chelsea, Massachusetts on July 7, 1857. He is the son of harbor Pilot Captain John Low and Susan Lydia Young. He followed his father in the pilot business. He married Lillian B Stevens in 1922 when he was sixty-five years old. The pilot boat Edwin Forrest, was built to the order of his father John Low.

Career 

Captain Johnson was known as the dean of Boston Harbor pilots and one of the best known pilots in the country. He was skilled with vessels of any size and never had a serious boating accident. He became Quartermaster on the USS Nantasket and USS Nahant boats before receiving his pilots' commission, which he received on September 1, 1885. He served on the pilot boats Liberty, Hesper, and Eben D. Jordan.

The Liberty was registered as a pilot Schooner with the ‘’Record of American and Foreign Shipping,’’ from 1897 to 1900, with the ship master as John. H. Low and owner as Susie Low. Susan "Susie" Low was his sister.

He was elected secretary and treasurer and then president of the American National Pilots' Association, representing every port in the United States.  He took the RMS Majestic in and out on visits to the Boston dry dock and handled the SS Leviathan on the first outing into dry dock in May 1923. During World War I he worked in the Boston Harbor and was commissioned as an officer in the United States Navy.

On January 22, 1911, Captain Low, scattered the ashes of long time shipmate and friend Captain John C. Silva. According to Silva's request, Low went out in a pilot boat to distribute the ashes into the sea.

Low retired as a Boston harbor pilot on April 24, 1928. He was a member of the Boston Pilots' Relief Society. He was also a member of Robert Lash Lodge, A. F. & A. M. of Chelsea, and the Elks.

Death 

Low died on July 4, 1934, at the age of 76, in Chelsea, Massachusetts. His wife and sister, Martha K. Low, survived him. Funeral services were held by Rev James G. Lane of the First Methodist Church. He was buired at the Forestdale Cemetery in Holyoke, Massachusetts.

See also
 List of Northeastern U. S. Pilot Boats

References

1934 deaths
People from Massachusetts
Maritime pilotage
1857 births
Sea captains